Everything Hits at Once: The Best of Spoon is a greatest hits compilation album by American rock band Spoon. It was released on July 26, 2019, through Matador Records. The compilation was announced on June 19, 2019, coinciding with the release of new single "No Bullets Spent."

The album was conceived and compiled by Spoon lead singer Britt Daniel, who chose the track list to act as an introduction to the band for new listeners. Other tracks, such as "My Mathematical Mind" from Gimme Fiction and selections from A Series of Sneaks, were considered by Daniel but were cut due to time constraints. Although greatest hits compilations were uncommon by the late 2010s, Daniel chose to create Everything Hits at Once based on his fondness for such compilations, in particular Standing on a Beach by The Cure and Substance 1987 by New Order, which had introduced him to those artists in his youth. 

A companion compilation, titled All the Weird Kids Up Front, was released in August 2020 and featured a track list selected by Spoon fans.

Track listing

Personnel
Britt Daniel – lead vocals (all tracks), guitar, bass, keyboards, percussion
Jim Eno − drums, percussion (all tracks)
Rob Pope – bass, guitar, keyboards (2-4, 6, 7, 9, 10, 11, 13)
Alex Fischel – keyboards, guitar (2, 4, 7, 9, 13)
Joshua Zarbo – bass (5, 12)
Eric Harvey – piano, keyboards (3, 6, 9, 10), guitar (2, 4)
Gerardo Larios – bass, percussion (13).

Charts

References

2019 greatest hits albums
Spoon (band) albums
Matador Records compilation albums